This is a list of protests in the U.S. State of West Virginia related to the murder of George Floyd.

Locations

Beckley 
As many as 50 protesters met in Beckley at the corner of Robert C. Byrd Drive and Neville Street on Sunday, May 31, for a peaceful demonstration.

Charleston 
A group of protesters marched around the West Virginia State Capitol complex on May 30. Hundreds of people protested police brutality outside of Charleston City Hall and the Charleston Police Department on May 31.

Clarksburg 
On June 3, a crowd of about 100 people gathered outside the Harrison County Courthouse and marched through downtown Clarksburg. At one point protesters lied down in the streets while chanting, "I can't breathe."

Fairmont 
A large group marched through the streets of downtown Fairmont on May 30. Hundreds filled the streets.

Huntington 
There were two protests in Huntington on May 30, one at Ritter Park and a second one at Pullman Square. Hundreds of protesters attended.

Morgantown 
Protesters gathered on the downtown campus of West Virginia University on May 30. In addition, hundreds of protesters marched in downtown Morgantown on June 2.

Parkersburg 
On May 31, a crowd of protesters peacefully marched through downtown Parkersburg. Although they did not have a permit to protest, no arrests were made.

Weirton 
On June 6, protesters peacefully demonstrated against police brutality outside the Weirton Community Center.

Wheeling 
Hundreds of people participated in a protest on May 31 in downtown Wheeling.

References 

West Virginia
2020 in West Virginia
Events in West Virginia
Riots and civil disorder in West Virginia
May 2020 events in the United States
June 2020 events in the United States